Alchemy is an album released in 1969 by the Third Ear Band.

Track listing
All compositions by Coff, Minns and Sweeney, except "Lark Rise" (Tomlin)

 "Mosaic" – 6:31
 "Ghetto Raga" – 10:32
 "Druid One" – 3:49
 "Stone Circle" – 3:28
 "Egyptian Book of the Dead" – 8:55
 "Area Three" – 8:33
 "Dragon Lines" – 5:33
 "Lark Rise" – 2:46

Personnel
 Paul Minns – oboe, recorder
 Mel Davis – cello, pipe
 Glen Sweeney – chimes, drums, tabla, wind chimes, hand drums
 Richard Coff – violin, viola
with:
 Dave Tomlin – violin on "Lark Rise"
 John Peel – harmonica, Jew's harp on "Area Three"
Technical
Ken Scott, Peter Mew - engineer
Dave Loxley - design, artwork
Ray Stevenson - photography

References

1969 debut albums
Third Ear Band albums
Albums produced by Peter Jenner
Harvest Records albums